King Prawn are an English ska punk band founded in 1993. The band split in 2003, later reforming for a second run in 2012.

History
The band's formation was in London, 1993. The first major recording was First Offence three years later, produced by Martin "Ace" Kent of Skunk Anansie.

King Prawn toured regularly with a broad range of bands, varying from hardcore to traditional and 2 Tone ska bands.

The band called time on their first incarnation in 2003.

Hiatus 
After the band split, Babar Luck, the bass player, started to perform under his own name. In 2006, he release the album Care in the Community, and has since released several solo and collaborative recordings. 

In the summer of 2007, Al Rumjen joined Asian Dub Foundation as their new vocalist. His first performance as a member of Asian Dub Foundation was at The Womad Festival in Singapore and his first album with the band was Punkara.

Reformation 
In 2012, the band reformed and played festivals and a club tour. They featured an extended brass section with a keys player, but without Babar Luck.

In 2013, the band played at Boomtown Festival and Reading & Leeds Festivals and competed a UK tour in November 2013.

The band released two tracks on the Bandcamp platform in 2014.

A fifth LP was released in April 2019 called The Fabulous new sounds of ... on Cherry Red Records.

In 2020, the band released two singles and started work on their sixth album.

Awards 
They were nominated for a Kerrang! award in 1998 for Best New British Band, and in 2000 for Spirit of Independence.

Style
King Prawn blend elements of punk, hardcore, metal, ska, dub, reggae, and hip hop into their music, which they dub "wildstyle". In 2016, Jones stated that The Dead Kennedys, Crass, Public Enemy, Rage Against the Machine, and Bob Marley all influenced the band.

Members

Current members 
 Al Rumjen - vocals
 Nikolai Jones - drums
 Devil Hands - guitar
 Zac Chang  bass guitar
 Dr Nelly - cornet
 Alex Gordon - trumpet
 Matt Dowse - trombone
 Nick Horne - Keyboards & trumpet

Former members 
 Babar Luck (1993–2003) bass guitar

Discography

Studio albums
 First Offence - 1995, (extended EP, 2001 remastered & re-released)
 Fried in London - 1998, (2001 remastered & re-released)
 Surrender to the Blender - 2000
 Got the Thirst - 2003
 The Fabulous New Sounds of... - 2019

Singles and EPs
 Poison in the Air" - 1995
 Felled/Depths of my Soul" - 1997
 Not Your Punk" - 1997
Your Worst Enemy (EP) - 1999
 Day In Day Out" - 2000
 Someone to Hate" - 2000
 Done Days / A Solemn Man" - 2014
Rockas an' Them - 2020
New Vibrations - 2020

Music videos
 "Depths of My Soul" (1997)
 "Day In Day Out" (2000)
 "Someone to Hate" (2000)
 "The Dominant View" (2003)

References

External links 
 King Prawn interview 

English punk rock groups
Third-wave ska groups
Underground punk scene in the United Kingdom
English ska musical groups
Political music groups
Musical groups from London